Goya is an administrative neighborhood of Madrid belonging to the district of Salamanca. As of 1 March 2020, it has a population of 30,010. The WiZink Center is located in the neighborhood.

References 

Wards of Madrid
Salamanca (Madrid)